The 2003–04 Bundesliga was the 41st season of the Bundesliga, Germany's premier football league. It began on 1 August 2003 and concluded on 22 May 2004.

Teams
Eighteen teams competed in the league – the top fifteen teams from the previous season and the three teams promoted from the 2. Bundesliga. The promoted teams were SC Freiburg, 1. FC Köln and Eintracht Frankfurt. SC Freiburg and 1. FC Köln returned to the top flight after an absence of one years while Eintracht Frankfurt returned to the top fight after an absence of two years. They replaced Arminia Bielefeld, 1. FC Nürnberg and Energie Cottbus, ending their top flight spells of one, two and three years respectively.

Team overview

(*) Promoted from 2. Bundesliga.

League table

Results

Overall
Most wins - Werder Bremen (22)
Fewest wins - 1. FC Köln (6)
Most draws - Hertha BSC (12)
Fewest draws - VfL Wolfsburg (3)
Most losses - 1. FC Köln (23)
Fewest losses - Werder Bremen (4)
Most goals scored - Werder Bremen (79)
Fewest goals scored - 1860 Munich and 1. FC Köln (32)
Most goals conceded - SC Freiburg (67)
Fewest goals conceded - VfB Stuttgart (24)

Top goalscorers

Champion squad

References

External links
 2003–04 Bundesliga on kicker.de

Bundesliga seasons
1
Germany